Baodai Lu (Chinese: 宝带路) is a station of Line 3 and Line 4 of Suzhou Rail Transit. The station is located in Wuzhong District of Suzhou. It has been in use since 15 April 2017, the same time of the operation of Line 4. The Line 3 platforms opened on 25 December 2019.

Suzhou Rail Transit stations
Railway stations in China opened in 2017